Taiwan–Ukraine relations refer to the international relations between Taiwan and Ukraine. Bilateral relations after Ukraine's independence began in 1992.

Taiwan has no representative office in Ukraine. The consulate issues are handled via the representative office located in Moscow. But this authority has been temporarily transferred to Taipei representative office in Warsaw on 26 February 2022 due to the outbreak of the Russian invasion of Ukraine.

History

Cold War 
The Republic of China government retreated to Taiwan after their defeat in the Chinese Civil War to the Chinese Communist Party in 1949. With the onset of the Cold War, the legitimate representative of China in the United Nations has become one of the disputing point between member states.

On 24 November 1966, the United Nations General Assembly met at the twenty-first session to discuss the representation of China. The Soviet Ukrainian representative spoke at first, advocating to vacate the seat of the Republic of China immediately and change the representative right to the People's Republic of China, claiming that the case was not under the scope of important issue covered by the Article 18 of the Charter of the United Nations.

After the session, the General Assembly passed Resolution 1668, declaring that any proposal to change the representation of China at the United Nations would require two-thirds majority vote.

The end of the 1960s and the beginning of the 1970s saw the rapid deterioration of Taiwan's diplomatic relations. On 26 August 1971, as Taiwan was on the edge of being expelled from the United Nations, the ambassador of Taiwan to Honduras requested through foreign minister of Honduras to suggest dual representation as an alternative to Communist China's representation in the United Nations, citing the Soviet Union, Soviet Belarus and Soviet Ukraine as examples. At the United Nations General Assembly Resolution 2758, the Soviet Ukrainian representatives along with majority of the UN members voted support to expel the representatives of Taiwan.

1992: First contact 

After the fall of the Soviet Union, and the independence of Ukraine. In response to the generally poor political and economic situation in the former Soviet Union countries, the United States was concerned that the collapse of the Soviet Union would lead to an influx of refugees into Western Europe. The U.S. hoped that Taiwan would provide direct financial assistance in U.S. dollars to Russia and Ukraine, as Taiwan had an abundant foreign exchange reserve at the time. This also prompted Taiwan to make Belarus and Ukraine the target of diplomatic breakthrough.

The U.S. asked Taiwan for $30 million in aid, and proposed to give half of it to Russia and half to Ukraine. Qian Fu and Chiang Hsiao Yen decided to provide aid in kind instead of direct money to the United States. Therefore, the final aid case was changed that Taiwan to provide living supplies, medicine and medical equipment. The initial donation was set at US$30 million, but only US$10 million was spent in the end. Since there is no direct flight between Taiwan and Ukraine, the Boeing 747s were transported from Vladivostok, Russia, back to the Keelung Harbor and arrived in Kyiv by a tortuous voyage.

In January 1992, Taiwan's Undersecretary for Foreign Affairs Chiang Hsiao-yen visited Ukraine for the first time to exchange views with Ukraine on economic and trade cooperation, science and technology. He met with the Minister of Defense, the Minister of Investment and Construction, and the Minister of Foreign Economic Relations of Ukraine even though it was the time when China and Ukraine established diplomatic relations.

In March 1992, Chinese diplomat Yu Zhenqi learned from the Russian newspaper Izvestia that a Taiwanese plane would be arriving in Kyiv at the end of March. In the afternoon of April 7, Yu Zhenqi learned from a newspaper that Chang Hsiao-yen would arrive in Kyiv on the same day and that an agreement on the establishment of a diplomatic mission might be reached. Yu Zhenqi made an urgent appointment with Ukrainian First Deputy Foreign Minister Makarevich to make representations. Makarevich claimed that never heard of Taiwan setting up a representative agency in Kyiv. China has asked the Ukrainian side not to have any official contact with Taiwanese officials.

At 12:30 p.m., the Ukrainian state television broadcast the unloading of medicine from the Taiwanese plane, no Ukrainian officials appeared.

On the morning of April 8, Yu Zhenqi called the Vice Dean of the Ukrainian Institute of International Relations, Kulinich, and organized a mobilization of Chinese students studying in Ukraine, those students all had a high political passion for this. However, one of the Chinese students found out that the Ukrainian Minister of Health was present at the handover ceremony. Yu Zhenqi again raised the issue with Makarevich, who said that it was unexpected and the actions of individual officials. This incident also made Ukrainian President Kravchuk furious. He criticized the official at the cabinet meeting and announced that the cabinet members are not allowed to participate in any Taiwan-related activities in the future.

On April 11, Taiwan's Undersecretary for Foreign Affairs left Kyiv. Ukraine, soon after independence, suffered from economic difficulties, and there were still some pro-Taiwan Ukrainian MPs and economists who advocate establishing diplomatic relations with Taiwan in exchange for aid. This led to an unusual parliamentary speech in which Kulinich (also a member of parliament) broke his silence and expressed his opposition. He said.

After this speech, people suddenly realized that no one in the Ukrainian parliament would dare to raise the issue of establishing diplomatic relations with Taiwan from then on.

1996: Second contact 
Taiwan's diplomatic activism reached its peak during the presidency of Ukrainian President Leonid Kuchma. In 1996, Taiwan attempted to have a second official exchange with Ukraine in a secret diplomacy.

In July 1996, diplomatic preparations began. In order to avoid Chinese protests, Lien Chan's trip was completely concealed, so much so that the Taiwanese media did not even know which foreign city he was visiting, with some newspapers mistakenly thinking it was Munich, Germany or Budapest, Hungary, and only the United Daily News guessed it was Kyiv. This was a rare situation in the Taiwan press, and it was not the usual style to have no accompanying reporters. Also in contrast to the United States, where American people hated the press media and supported the government's exclusion of reporters during major events.

On August 18, 1996, Lien Chan was invited by Victor Vasilievich Skopenko, Rector of Kyiv University, to receive an honorary doctorate degree from the university. On August 22, Lien Chan returned to Taipei and gave a press conference on his visit to Ukraine. He did not disclose official details of his visit to Kyiv because Ukraine promised not to provoke China.

When the Chinese government learned of the incident afterwards, it took an unusually tough stance and launched a series of fierce diplomatic retaliations against Ukraine. This included the refusal of Chinese envoys to participate in Ukraine's Independence Day celebrations, the cancellation of a major visit to Ukraine, and the avoidance of meetings with the Ukrainian military delegation. China's protests also strained relations between China and Ukraine. The Chinese media at the time downplayed the issue.
	
The visit in 1996 generated a lot of media coverage in Taiwan. Lien Chan also told the public that he could work with Ukraine in the aviation and metallurgy industries. The incident led to speculation in the mass media in Taiwan, Hong Kong, and neighboring countries that Taiwan and Ukraine could develop military ties. However, Lien Chan's visit also resulted in a strong stance by China, which in turn limited the development of relations between Ukraine and Taiwan. As a result, relations between the two sides were frozen until 2001.

2004-2007: From friendliness to frostiness 
After the Orange Revolution, Chen Shui-bian learned that Viktor Yushchenko had been elected president of Ukraine, and the Taiwanese government sent a telegram to congratulate him. Chen Shui-bian mentioned in the telegram that Taiwan also completed the change of political parties in 2000 and conducted the first referendum in 2004, which was the first time for the people of Taiwan to have the basic human right of referendum.

The Chen administration initially admired the Yushchenko government, even going so far as to include an orange scarf presented by David Kilgour, a member of Canada's federal House of Commons, as a presidential artifact. However, the friendship between the two sides was short-lived.

In December 2005, Taiwan's Deputy Secretary of the Presidential Office Huang Chi-fang accepted an invitation from Ukrainian MP Viktor Pinchuk to visit the country. It surprised Ukrainian Prime Minister Yury Ekhanurov. He reprimanded the Ukrainian Foreign Ministry and said that granting visas to Taiwanese officials would only harm relations between Ukraine and China, as China does not consider Taiwan a country.

After 2006, Taiwan abolished its representative office in Minsk. The official reasons for the abolition were the lack of functionality and the unfriendliness of Belarus to Taiwan. As for the suspension of contact with Ukraine, no official reason was provided. The reporter of United Daily News believes that this is also the beginning of the regression of Taiwan-Ukraine relations, which had continued until March 2022.

2022 Russian invasion of Ukraine

In 2022, Taiwan (the ROC) began to send some humanitarian aid to Ukraine at the Russian military invasion of the country. 27 tons of medical supplies were sent to Ukraine.

A small number of Taiwanese volunteers have served in the International Legion of Territorial Defense of Ukraine.

On 22 April 2022, Minister of Foreign Affairs of Taiwan Joseph Wu held a meeting via video conferencing with Mayor of Kyiv Vitali Klitschko. During the meeting, Wu announced that $3 million would be provided to aid in reconstruction of Kyiv following the Russian invasion of Ukraine, while the remaining $5 million will go to six medical institutions in Ukraine.

In response to the Russian invasion of Ukraine, Taiwan imposed sanctions against Russia and numerous rallies in support of Ukraine have taken place in the Taiwanese capital city of Taipei. According to Nikkei Asia, anti-China sentiment and pro-Taiwan momentum is growing within Ukrainian public opinion due to China's refusal to condemn or even criticize Russia's invasion of Ukraine, as well as China's amicable relations with Russia.

In August 2022, 15 MPs of the Verkhovna Rada became part of a cross-parliamentary group to promote closer friendship, trade, and cultural ties with Taiwan. One of the members of the group, MP Inna Sovsun, stated that the group would serve a bridge that would start cooperation between Ukrainian and Taiwanese MPs at the official level and may lead to the future opening of a representative office of Taiwan in Ukraine.

Ukraine has purchased significant quantities of military drones from Taiwan. Early in the conflict Ukrainian forces ordered 800 mortar dropping drones from Taiwanese manufacturer DronesVision through Polish intermediaries.

In October 2022 Ukrainian lawmaker Kira Rudik visited Taiwan.

Issue on diplomatic missions 
 
Taiwan has been planning to establish a consulate in Kyiv since 1992. Alarmed by the Latvian model, the Chinese government made representations to the Ukrainian diplomatic service and received an immediate commitment from the Ukrainian side that it would not allow a Taiwanese consulate to appear, as it had in Latvia. Then, Taiwan saw that the establishment of the consulate was unsuccessful and turned to seek a representative office.

On February 9, 2001, when former Ukrainian President Leonid Kravchuk visited Taiwan as a member of parliament, Chen Shui-bian told him that Taiwan and Ukraine should establish a representative office to increase exchanges. However, Ukraine did not respond to the request.

Issue on the representative office is also hindered by the demands of the Ukrainian side. According to a joint report by Bai-Ku Wei and Viktor Oleksiyovich Kiktenko, the Ukrainian authorities want Taiwan to invest heavily in military industrial technology and help the military industry realize its "military-to-civilian" program. Taiwan, on the other hand, is asking for the establishment of a representative office first, and then to discuss investment in depth. At the same time, the Ukrainian side also hopes that Taiwan will first provide a large amount of financial assistance to Ukraine, similar to the Belarusian approach.

Consular services 
In 1996, the Taipei Representative Office in Belarus was established to also conduct consular services in Ukraine, and in 2006, Taiwan abolished the office and transferred the Ukraine business to the Taipei Office in Moscow, which continued until March 2022.

Academic exchange 
On January 7, 1993, Rector Skopenko of Kyiv University visited Taiwan for nine days, during which time Kyiv University signed a contract with Culture University and Chiao Tung University to start bilateral academic exchanges.

Ukrainian language teaching 
The following is a list of the most important universities that cooperate with Ukraine and teach Ukrainian.

| Example || Example || Example || Example

See also 
 Foreign relations of Taiwan, ROC
 Foreign relations of Ukraine

References 

 
Ukraine
Taiwan